Rheinseilbahn (literally "Rhine Cable Car") may refer to one of two cable cars across the Rhine in Germany:

 The Cologne Cable Car in Cologne. 
 The Koblenz Cable Car in Koblenz.